Rosemary Potter is a former member of the Wisconsin State Assembly.

Biography
Potter was born on April 15, 1952 in Milwaukee, Wisconsin. She graduated from Bay View High School and the University of Wisconsin–Milwaukee before serving as an intern with the United Nations. Potter was later a member of the faculty at Milwaukee Area Technical College, Alverno College and the University of Wisconsin–Milwaukee and spent time in Italy, India, Argentina, Uruguay, Brazil, Chile and Japan.

Political career
Potter was first elected to the Assembly in a special election in 1989. In 1993, she became the first woman to serve as Majority Caucus Chairperson in Wisconsin. She later became Minority Caucus Chairperson in 1995 and 1997. Potter is a Democrat.

References

Politicians from Milwaukee
Democratic Party members of the Wisconsin State Assembly
Women state legislators in Wisconsin
Milwaukee Area Technical College people
University of Wisconsin–Milwaukee faculty
University of Wisconsin–Milwaukee alumni
1952 births
Living people
Bay View High School alumni
American women academics
21st-century American women